2-Acetylthiophene is an organosulfur compound with the formula CH3C(O)C4H3S.  A yellow liquid, it is the more useful of the two isomers of acetylthiophene. It is of commercial interest as a precursor to both thiophene-2-carboxylic acid and thiophene-2-acetic acid.  It is prepared by the reaction of thiophene with acetyl chloride in the presence of stannic chloride.

References

Thiophenes
Carboxylic acids